The 1938 football season was São Paulo's 9th season since the club's founding in 1930.

Overall

{|class="wikitable"
|-
|Games played || 42 (10 Campeonato Paulista, 32 Friendly match)
|-
|Games won || 18 (6 Campeonato Paulista, 12 Friendly match)
|-
|Games drawn || 6 (2 Campeonato Paulista, 4 Friendly match)
|-
|Games lost || 18 (2 Campeonato Paulista, 16 Friendly match)
|-
|Goals scored || 93
|-
|Goals conceded || 79
|-
|Goal difference || +14
|-
|Best result || 8–1 (H) v Luzitano - Campeonato Paulista - 1938.11.13
|-
|Worst result || 0–5 (H) v Portuguesa - Campeonato Paulista - 1939.04.02
|-
|Most appearances || 
|-
|Top scorer || 
|-

Friendlies

Paulista Extra

Torneio Noturno

Official competitions

Campeonato Paulista

Record

References

External links
official website 

Association football clubs 1938 season
1938
1938 in Brazilian football